Benzene-1,2-dithiol is the organosulfur compound with the formula CH(SH). This colourless viscous liquid consists of a benzene ring with a pair of adjacent thiol groups. The conjugate base of this diprotic compound serves as chelating agent in coordination chemistry and a building block for the synthesis of other organosulfur compounds.

Synthesis
The compound is prepared by ortho-lithiation of benzenethiol using butyl lithium (BuLi) followed by sulfidation:
CHSH + 2 BuLi → CHSLi-2-Li + 2 BuH
CHSLi-2-Li + S → CH(SLi)
CH(SLi) + 2 HCl → CH(SH) + 2 LiCl

The compound was first prepared from 2-aminobenzenethiol via diazotization.  Alternatively, it forms from 1,2-dibromobenzene.

Reactions
Oxidation mainly affords the polymeric disulfide.  Reaction with metal dihalides and metal oxides gives the dithiolate complexes of the formula LM(SCH) where LM represents a variety of metal centers, e.g. (CH)Ti.  Ketones and aldehydes condense to give the heterocycles called dithianes:
CH(SH) + RR’CO → CH(S)CRR’ + HO

Related compounds
3,4-Toluenedithiol, also called dimercaptotoluene (CAS#496-74-2), behaves similarly to 1,2-benzenedithiol but is a solid at ambient temperatures (m.p. 135-137 °C).

Alkene-1,2-dithiols are unstable, although metal complexes of alkene-1,2-dithiolates, called dithiolene complexes, are well known.

References

Thiols
Benzene derivatives
Foul-smelling chemicals